Castle Talk is the fourth studio album by the Screaming Females, released on September 4, 2010 by Don Giovanni Records.

Track listing
All songs written by Screaming Females (Jarrett Dougherty, Mike "King Mike" Abbate, Marissa Paternoster).
 "Laura And Marty"  – 3:57
 "I Don't Mind It"  – 3:28
 "Boss"  – 3:56
 "Normal"  – 2:50
 "A New Kid"  – 3:20
 "Fall Asleep"  – 4:04
 "Wild"  – 3:42
 "Nothing At All"  – 3:11
 "Sheep"  – 3:06
 "Deluxe"  – 1:43
 "Ghost Solo" - 3:32

References

Screaming Females albums
Don Giovanni Records albums
2010 albums